Edis Matusevičius (born 30 June 1996) is a Lithuanian athlete specialising in the javelin throw. He represented his country at the 2017 World Championships without registering a valid mark in the qualifying round. In addition, he won the bronze medal at the 2015 European Junior Championships.

His personal best in the event is 89.17 m set in Lithuanian Championship in Palanga in 2019. This is the current national record.

International competitions

References

1996 births
Living people
Lithuanian male javelin throwers
World Athletics Championships athletes for Lithuania
Universiade silver medalists for Lithuania
Universiade medalists in athletics (track and field)
Competitors at the 2017 Summer Universiade
Medalists at the 2019 Summer Universiade
Athletes (track and field) at the 2020 Summer Olympics
Olympic athletes of Lithuania